The following article presents a summary of the 1909 football (soccer) season in Paraguay.

Liga Paraguaya results
The championship was played for the "Copa El Diario", a trophy issued by the newspaper of the same name. Six teams participated in the tournament which was played in a two-round all-play-all system, being the team with the most points at the end of the two rounds the champion. Club Nacional won its first championship after defeating Libertad in a playoff game.

Note: Since both Nacional and Libertad finished with the same number of points, a playoff game was played to decide to championship. The game was won 3-1 by Nacional.

References
 Paraguay - League History 1906-1964 by Karel Stokkermans at RSSSF
 Historia de la APF

External links
 APF Website

Paraguayan Primera División seasons
Para
1